The Bakwa Dishi is a people belonging to the Luba ethnic group living today in the Kasai-Oriental Province in the Democratic Republic of Congo. Miabi, the Dishi Capital, is located  West of Mbuji-Mayi.

They speak Tshiluba in spite of their history with the Lunda Empire, and their dialect is considered the oldest and purest among the Luba-Kasai.

Origins 

In the 17th century, the Luba Prince Tshibinda Ilunga son of Ilunga Mbili leaves the Luba Empire ruled by his brother Kalala Ilunga and marries Queen Naweej of the Lunda. He brings with him the Luba customs (such as the Luba style of ceremonial chieftainship) and culture and religion introduced by his father; and enlarges the Kingdom to become an Empire rivaling his brother, even greatly surpassing him. He extends the empire to the south of current Zambia, east of Angola and south west of the Democratic Republic of Congo. Tshibinda Ilunga is crowned Emperor and is praised as a "God-King" or "Anointed One" and civilizing hero.

His son Mwata Mutomb succeeds him and becomes the first Mwata Yamvo. Though his father was praised as a civilizing hero; Mwata Mutomb's authority is disputed by the Lunda who consider him and his family as foreigners. Because of numerous civil wars, he and the rest of the Imperial family are forced to capitulate and thus cut all ties with the Lunda people and begin a migration which Mwata Mutomb leads. At the death of Queen Naweej, it is one of her brother's son who is crowned; he assumes the style and title of Mwata Yamvo which all future Lunda rulers will assumes.

Founding 
At the death of Mwata Mutomb, his son Mbuyi Tshitenge succeeded him, then Kamanga Matunlungu, then finally Kafwembe succeeded him in place of his father Mwanza Mukala. At his inauguration Kafwemb chose to carry the title of MBAYI which means prince or Lord in Chilunda. Mbayi Kafwemb leads the migration westward and finally settles down around a salted lake named Dishi which is now drained. The descendant of Tshibinda Ilunga took the name of the lake and today they still carry the name of the Bakwa Dishi. It was at the end of the 17th century that Mbayi Kafwemb firmly established the Kingdom of the Bakwa Dishi and was prosperous in the business of salt.

Kingship 
The power is transmitted by blood in the Luba culture, but with the Bakwa Dishi in particular, it is transmitted two ways. First by blood, then inside the bloodline, it can be transmitted by wealth. In other words, if one is not a member of the Royal Family he will never be able to rule; but if he is of the Royal Family but is not wealthy he will not be able to rule either. When the King dies, it is either one of his brothers, sons or nephews that can replace him. There is no pre-determined order. It is only their moral and mystical aptitudes as well material capabilities that will determine which one will be chosen by the King as his heir. In the event that the King dies without designating his successor, it is those same aptitudes and conditions that will be taken into account by the members of the Royal Family to designate the heir to the throne.

By moral aptitude, it is understood that the life of a King must be an example. He must be good, just, courageous, and especially showcase a sense of leadership. By mystical aptitude, it is understood that the King has been initiated to different degrees of traditional knowledge. Finally, by material capabilities, it means that the King must have enough riches to take care of his subjects.

Today 
The Bakwa Dishi realm is composed of 23 different clans. Each clan is headed by a Chief. Here is the list of the different Bakwa Dishi clans: 
Mbayi 
Muyombo 
Nyandu 
Mbuyi 
Tshimuna 
Kayombo 
Tshimungu 
Kalonji 
Mpemba 
Ndumbi 
Kasansa 
Lukanda 
Kanda 
Kaye 
Mbadi 
Tshiala 
Mushingala 
Mbiya 
Mulenga 
Ntembwe 
Nsumba 
Mbwanga 
Lubashi

The ruling clan of the Bakwa Dishi is that of the Bena Mbayi (sons of Mbayi), which is led by the royal family under André-Philippe Futa. After the death of the Kazadi Diofua, the last King of the Bakwa Dishi; Futa who was the chosen heir was to young to rule. His father and uncles assumed the regency while he continued his studies which eventually took him overseas.

After many years out of the D. R. Congo, Andre-Philippe Futa was called by President Joseph Kabila of the Democratic Republic of Congo, hence came back and served in the government and eventually became Minister of Finance. During election 2006, he led the multi-party Alliance of the Presidential Majority (French: Alliance pour la majorité présidentielle, AMP) as Coordinator and helped Kabila win the election. He was elected Senator of Kasai Oriental in 2007.
 
Andre-Philippe Futa Mudiumbula Tshitumbu is planned to be recognized as the traditional ruler and crowned King and grand chief of the Bakwa Dishi and Miabi.

Family tree of the Bakwa Dishi Royal Family:

1585	Foundation of the Luba Empire with Ilunga Mbili

1600s	Tshibinda Ilunga (Luba Prince and Emperor of the Lunda and brother to Kalala Ilunga Emperor of the Luba)
1600s	Mwata Mutomb (Emperor of the Lunda was the first Mwata Yamvo) 
1600s	Mbuyi Tshitenge	
1600s	Kamanga Matunlungu	 
1600s	Mwanza Mukala	

Foundation of the Kingdom of the Bakwa Dishi	

1600s	Mbayi Kafwemb (King of the Bakwa Dishi)	 
1700s	Mulumba Mungedi (Grand Chief of the Bena Mbayi)	 
1700s	Kalonji (Grand Chief of the Bena Mbayi) 
1700s	Diala
1700s	Kalonji Bambakani (Chief of the Bena Mbayi)	
1800s	Nsenda Kalubi	
1800s	Tshipadi Tshikoni (Grand Chief of the Bena Mbayi)	
1800s	Tshipadi Mfuta (Chief of the Bena Mbayi)
1860s	Muka Muyombu (Chief of the Bena Mbayi)
1880s	Nyoka Mule wa Muka (Chief of the Bena Mbayi)
1910	Kabongo Mwabilayi (Chief of the Bena Mbayi and regent of the throne of the Bakwa Dishi	and brother to Kazadi Diofua King of the Bakwa Dishi)
1943	Mbayi Futa Tshitumbu André-Philippe (Soon to be crowned King of the Bakwa Dishi and Miabi)	

Grand Princes of the Bakwa Dishi

1969	Kabongo Mwabilayi Jean-Philippe	 
1971	Mbuyamba Kalambayi Jean-Juin	 
1973	Mulumba Mungedi Bashadila Jean-Leon	 
1976	Kazadi Diofua Jean-Jacques	 
1980	Mbombo Kalanga Jean-Joseph	 
1982	Babaka Kankolongo André-Marie	
1993	Mvidié Ntambwe Jean-Laurent

1993    Kalonji Niamke Philippe Olivier

Princesses of the Bakwa Dishi

1968	Ntumba Bilema Melanie	 
1987	Mpunga Carole 	 
1990	Odia Tshiamboya Marie-Madeleine

References

Ethnic groups in the Democratic Republic of the Congo